Sphingomonas parapaucimobilis is a species of bacteria. Its type strain is JCM 7510 (= GIFU 11387).

References

External links

Type strain of Sphingomonas parapaucimobilis at BacDive -  the Bacterial Diversity Metadatabase

parapaucimobilis
Bacteria described in 1990